Novo Konomladi ( New Konomladi) is a village in Petrich Municipality, in Blagoevgrad Province, Bulgaria.

History

Most of the modern population of Novo Konomladi descends from Bulgarian refugees from the village of Konomladi (present-day Makrochori), Western Macedonia, Greece, who relocated to Bulgaria after the Balkan Wars of 1912–1913.

There were 302 inhabitants in the village in 1985.

References

Villages in Blagoevgrad Province